Giovanni Antonio de' Vecchi (died 1672) was a Roman Catholic prelate who served as Bishop of Ischia (1663–1672).

Biography
On 12 Feb 1663, Giovanni Antonio de' Vecchi was appointed during the papacy of Pope Alexander VII as Bishop of Ischia.
On 18 Feb 1663, he was consecrated bishop by Giulio Cesare Sacchetti, Cardinal-Bishop of Sabina. 
He served as Bishop of Ischia until his death in Apr 1672.

References

External links and additional sources
 (for Chronology of Bishops) 
 (for Chronology of Bishops) 

17th-century Italian Roman Catholic bishops
Bishops appointed by Pope Alexander VII
1672 deaths